Roydhouse Bridge is a covered bridge in the Oneida County, New York town of Bridgewater, just off US Route 20 on Doe Road.  It is a steel stringer bridge over Beaver Creek.

References

External links
 Roydhouse Bridge, at Covered Bridges of the Northeast USA

Covered bridges in New York (state)
Bridges completed in 1979
Wooden bridges in New York (state)
Transportation buildings and structures in Oneida County, New York
Tourist attractions in Oneida County, New York
Road bridges in New York (state)